Khushkar (also Romanized as Khūshkār; also known as Kheshkār and Khoskār) is a village in Kiskan Rural District, in the Central District of Baft County, Kerman Province, Iran. At the 2006 census, its population was 187, in 58 families.

References 

Populated places in Baft County